Ahir College Rewari is a college in Rewari, Haryana, India. It was established before India's independence. At that time Rewari was the only education hub. The Department of Science of Ahir College Rewari is also notable, in particular for Science Studies .

Introduction
Ahir College Rewari is a co-educational institution of higher learning. The college was founded in 1945. It was initially affiliated to the Panjab University. It is currently under Maharshi Dayanand University, sometimes called MD University, Rohtak.

Students in various activities

References

Universities and colleges in Haryana
Rewari
Educational institutions established in 1945
1945 establishments in India